Babushkinsky District, Moscow  is an administrative district (raion) of North-Eastern Administrative Okrug, and one of the 125 raions of Moscow, Russia.

It is named after the famous pilot and polar explorer Mikhail Babushkin, who was born here. Prior to renaming in 1939, the region was a village called Bordino. In 1960 it was incorporated into Moscow and urbanized. Many streets and objects in Babushkinsky and neighboring Losinoostrovsky and Yaroslavsky are named after various polar explorers.

See also
Administrative divisions of Moscow

References

Notes

Sources

Districts of Moscow
North-Eastern Administrative Okrug